Ísafold was an Icelandic newspaper, published weekly. It was founded in 1874 by the politician Björn Jónsson, who was the editor until 1909, when he became prime minister.

Ísafold was published until 1929, when it merged with Morgunblaðið.

References

Rxternal links

1874 establishments in Iceland
1929 disestablishments in Iceland
Defunct newspapers published in Iceland
Defunct weekly newspapers
Publications established in 1874
Publications disestablished in 1929
Weekly newspapers published in Iceland